Edward William Marvin (7 July 1878 – 24 March 1918) was an English-born South African first-class cricketer and South African Army soldier.

Marvin was born at Leicester in July 1878. He later emigrated to Transvaal Colony, where he played two first-class cricket matches for Gauteng in the 1908–09 Currie Cup against Border and Western Province. He scored 47 runs in these matches, with a highest score of 29. Marvin served in the First World War as a private in the South African Infantry, which formed part of the South African Overseas Expeditionary Force on the Western Front. On 21 March 1918, the Germans launched a new offensive, Operation Michael, during which Marvin was killed in action at Maricourt Wood on 24 March.

References

External links

1878 births
1918 deaths
Cricketers from Leicester
Emigrants from the United Kingdom to Transvaal Colony
South African cricketers
Gauteng cricketers
South African military personnel of World War I
South African military personnel killed in World War I
Military personnel from Leicester